John M. Wood is a major general in the United States Air Force. He commanded the Third Air Force at Ramstein Air Base from 2018 until 2020. He has over 4,000 flight hours.

Air Force career
John Wood graduated with a degree in aeronautical engineering from the University of California, Davis, and commissioned into the United States Air Force in 1989. He attended pilot training at Vance AFB, and remained as a T-38 Talon instructor pilot. He later flew the C-130 Hercules at Dyess AFB, and the KC-10 Extender at Travis AFB. He commanded the 32nd Air Refueling Squadron, the 437th Airlift Wing, and the 87th Air Base Wing. In 2018, he assumed command of the Third Air Force from Lieutenant General Richard M. Clark. On June 24, 2020, he relinquished command to Major General Randall Reed, and became the Director of Strategy, Engagement, and Programs for United States Africa Command until July 2021.

Effective dates of promotion

References

Living people
Recipients of the Defense Superior Service Medal
Recipients of the Legion of Merit
United States Air Force generals
University of California, Davis alumni
Year of birth missing (living people)